Vasily Struve may refer to:
 Friedrich Georg Wilhelm von Struve, Baltic German astronomer and geodesist
 Vasily Struve (historian), Soviet orientalist